Kyösti Kallio's fourth cabinet was the 21st government of Republic of Finland. Cabinet's time period was from October 7, 1936 to March 12, 1937. It was Minority government.

References

 

Kallio, 4
1936 establishments in Finland
1937 disestablishments in Finland
Cabinets established in 1936
Cabinets disestablished in 1937